Oberwil im Simmental railway station is a railway station in the municipality of Oberwil im Simmental, in the Swiss canton of Bern. It is an intermediate stop on the Spiez–Zweisimmen line and is served by local trains only.

Services 
The following services stop at Oberwil im Simmental:

References

External links 
 
 

Railway stations in the canton of Bern
BLS railway stations